is a Japanese illustrator, writer and actor. He has appeared in more than 40 films since 2001.

Career
In 2016, Franky received the Cut Above Award for Outstanding Performance in Film at Japan Cuts: Festival of New Japanese Film in New York.

Filmography

Television

Film

Web

Japanese dub

Awards

References

External links 

1963 births
Living people
Japanese male film actors
Japanese male television actors
Japanese male voice actors
Actors from Fukuoka Prefecture
21st-century Japanese male actors